The Lerwick Up Helly Aa is the largest Up Helly Aa fire festival celebrated annually on the last Tuesday in January in Lerwick, the capital of Shetland, Scotland. A Guizer Jarl has featured in each Lerwick Up Helly Aa since the introduction of the position in 1906. The Guizer Jarl is the chief guizer who (in the modern festival) leads a squad dressed as Vikings, and are the primary focus of the festival's proceedings. Only the Jarl's Squad dresses as Vikings; the festival's other squads dress up in other costumes associated with the act they perform throughout the halls opened after the torchlight procession.

It took until after the First World War until a squad of Vikings appeared in the festival every year. As the festival developed, the Guizer Jarl began to portray specific individuals from the sagas, or the history of Shetland. Later again, each Guizer Jarl would select both a name for the galley, which is constructed from October the previous year and burned at the culmination of the torchlight procession, along with a tune played by the Lerwick Brass Band as the Jarl leads his squad up the ranks of guizers just prior to the torchlight procession.

Those wishing to become Guizer Jarl must be elected to the Lerwick Up Helly Aa Committee (elections are held during mass meetings which all squads' members can attend), and then serve the committee for 15 years. Traditionally, women and girls were not permitted in any Lerwick squad, and as such were not able to become Guizer Jarl, however in 2022 the Lerwick Up Helly Aa Committee lifted this restriction for future festivals. While female guizers are permitted to varying degrees in the other Up Helly Aa festivals in Shetland, only two Up Helly Aas have had female Guizer Jarls: Angela Tait (now Leask), being the first female Jarl at the 1988 Walls Junior Up Helly Aa organised by the Brownies; and Lesley Simpson, who became the first adult female Jarl at the 2015 South Mainland Up Helly Aa.

List of Lerwick UHA Guizer Jarls

References

Sources 

 
 
 
 
 
 
 
 
 
 
 
 
 

Up Helly Aa
Lerwick
Traditions involving fire
Lerwic